U.S. Route 89A is a  north–south auxiliary U.S. highway (though its actual direction of travel is more east–west) in southwestern Kane County, Utah and northeastern Coconino County, Arizona in the southwestern United States. The highway is an old routing of U.S. Route 89 from Bitter Springs, Arizona to Kanab, Utah. The state of Arizona has designated this highway the Fredonia-Vermilion Cliffs Scenic Road. The highway is used to access the North Rim of Grand Canyon National Park and is known for the Navajo Bridge. Until 2008, the Utah portion was signed State Route 11.  The route provides the only direct road connection between the Arizona Strip and the rest of Arizona.



Route description
The highway's southern terminus is at U.S. Route 89 south of Page, Arizona. Its northern terminus is in Kanab, Utah, also at US 89. US 89A runs near or through Lee's Ferry, the Navajo Bridge, Vermilion Cliffs, the Kaibab Plateau, and Fredonia, Arizona.  The eastern portion of the highway runs through part of the Navajo Nation.  From Jacob Lake, Arizona State Route 67 (AZ 67) branches off south, leading to the North Rim of Grand Canyon National Park. US 89A then continues north to the neighboring cities of Fredonia, Arizona and Kanab, Utah. The Utah portion of US 89A is defined by Utah Code Annotated §72-4-114.

History

This was part of mainline US 89 until the construction of Glen Canyon Dam. In 1960, US 89 was moved to a new, more northerly route and the old route became US 89A.

The Utah segment of US 89A was first commissioned as part of Utah State Route 11. This highway ran from Nephi to the Arizona state line near Kanab. This route is still drivable as the modern US 89A, US 89, and Utah SR-132.  With the establishment of the United States highway system in 1926, most of SR-11 was used for the routing of US 89 through southern Utah; the internal designation used by state agencies remained SR-11.  In 1969, as part of a series of changes to state routes, the portion north of Sevier Junction (I-70 and US 89 near Joseph) was transferred to other routes, removing the only part of State Route 11 that was signed with the state designation. It is also during this time that a new alignment for US 89 was constructed to serve the Glen Canyon Dam, with SR-11 being now signed as US 89A south of Kanab and US 89 to the north. As part of the 1977 Utah state route renumbering to conform signage and legislative definitions, SR-11 was truncated to what is now signed US 89A.  The route was signed SR-11, with "TO US 89A" at the northern terminus in Kanab and a "TO US 89" at the Arizona state line.  In 2008, however, SR-11 was deleted after a bill in the Utah legislature was passed to restore U.S. Route 89A in Utah.

From 1941 to 1992, there was a discontinuous southern portion US 89A running from Flagstaff to Prescott, Arizona, now designated Arizona State Route 89A.

Junction list

See also

 List of U.S. Highways in Arizona
 List of U.S. Highways in Utah
 U.S. Route 89
 Arizona State Route 89A
 List of highways numbered 89

References

External links

 US-89A at Arizona Roads
 State Route 11 at Utah Highways

89A
89A
89A
A
Transportation in Kane County, Utah
Transportation in Coconino County, Arizona
Kanab, Utah